The Conecuh River (upper portion) and Escambia River (lower portion) are a single  river in the southern United States, which flows from Alabama through Florida into the Gulf of Mexico.

The Conecuh River rises near Union Springs, Alabama and flows  in a general southwesterly direction into Florida near the town of Century.

The river is dredged in the lower course.

See also
 List of Alabama rivers
 List of Florida rivers
 South Atlantic-Gulf Water Resource Region

References

External links
`* 

Rivers of Florida
Rivers of Alabama
Bodies of water of Escambia County, Florida
Bodies of water of Escambia County, Alabama
Bodies of water of Bullock County, Alabama
Alabama placenames of Native American origin